ForeFront Records is a contemporary Christian music and Christian rock record label founded in 1987 by Dan R. Brock, Eddie DeGarmo, Dana Key, and Ron W. Griffin. It was purchased by EMI in 1996 from Dan R. Brock and Eddie DeGarmo, and is a division of Universal Music Group under Capitol Christian Music Group.

In 1998, ForeFront released Ten: The Birthday Album, a two-CD compilation to celebrate their 10th anniversary that featured songs from several of their artists at the time with several song remakes of older songs performed by new bands.

Artists

Current
 TobyMac

Former

 Abandon (active, currently independent)
 Audio Adrenaline (also on Fair Trade Services) (disbanded)
 Michael Anderson
 The Benjamin Gate (disbanded)
 Big Tent Revival (independent)
 Bleach (currently independent)
 Clear (disbanded)
 Code of Ethics (disbanded)
 Considering Lily (inactive)
 DeGarmo and Key (inactive)
 dc Talk (hiatus)
 Dizmas (hiatus)
 Eddie DeGarmo (inactive)
 Eli (inactive)
 End Time Warriors (E.T.W.) (inactive)
 Mark Farner (active)
 Grammatrain (inactive)
 Guardian (currently independent)
 Holy Soldier (inactive)
 Larry Howard
 Iona (active, on Open Sky Records)
 Karthi
 Kevin Max (active, currently independent)
 Dana Key (deceased)
 Lil iROCC (active, with Jus Rock Records)
 Geoff Moore (inactive, with Rocketown Records)
 The Normals (disbanded)
 PAX217 (disbanded)
 Philmont (disbanded)
 Raze (disbanded)
 Rebecca St. James (active, with Beach Street/Reunion Records)
 Satellite Soul (active, new single STATIC released in 2020)
 Serene and Pearl (changed name to Considering Lily, currently inactive)
 Seven Day Jesus (disbanded)
 Peter Shambrook
 Skillet (active, formerly on Ardent Records/ presently on Atlantic Records)
 Smalltown Poets (hiatus)
 Pete Stewart (active)
 Steve Wiggins
 Stacie Orrico (hiatus, currently independent/ (Red Light Management)
 TAIT (hiatus)
 This Beautiful Republic (disbanded)

See also
 List of Christian record labels

References

External links
 

 
American record labels
Christian record labels
Record labels established in 1987
1987 establishments in the United States
Labels distributed by Universal Music Group
EMI